Matehy is a civil parish in the historical barony of Muskerry East in County Cork, Ireland. The civil parish is centred on a small settlement, also referred to as Matehy, which contains a Roman Catholic church (built ), a national (primary) school, and pub. Evidence of ancient settlement in the area include ringfort sites in Gilcagh townland, and a circular ecclesiastical enclosure containing the remains of a church (dating to at least the early 17th century) and a number of 18th century gravestones.

See also

 Courtbrack

References

Civil parishes of County Cork